The Lake Ainsworth Recreation Hall is a multi-purpose recreation hall, used for basketball, netball, badminton and other sports, as well as meetings, films and theatrical performances that is located at Lennox Head, in Northern New South Wales, Australia. The building was designed in 2005 by architectural firm Allen Jack+Cottier, replacing an old, worn-out indoor sports facility.

Design 
Lake Ainsworth's multi-purpose recreation hall uses an environmentally sustainable design as its principle. Inspiration for the building was drawn from the glass pavilions from the 1800s, in particular, Joseph Paxton's vision for The Crystal Palace which was built for the Great Exhibition in 1851, and subsequently relocated to its present site in South East London. It was regarded to be 'Winter Park and Garden under Glass'.
Although inspiration was taken from this building, the recreation hall at Lake Ainsworth had to face challenges of fitting a glass structure into a different climatic condition. Countries with temperate summer climates are able to sustain glass structures well where it provides wonderful internal light qualities, vast spaces and shelter from the countries' weather. In tropical or warmer climates however, glass palaces are less successful without extensive mechanical cooling and shading.

Not only did the design team have to overcome the climatic conditions of Australia, but the building also had to be simultaneously energy and environmentally efficient, respectful of the site, and inspirational for its users, whilst meeting tight budget constraints. Thus, a solution was achieved by utilising a heat stop cellular polycarbonate sheeting to the roof and walls where only a small portion of (solar) heat energy was transferred. Detailed modelling proved that Danpalon™, a translucent, insulating UV-resistant material, could be used over a steel frame to incorporate central ventilation for fresh air cooling. Energy usage is thus low and mechanical ventilation is not required.

The design includes three coloured services pods enclosed in a vivid luminescent tube-like box. The main area can be closed off at both ends and reacts to the weather outdoors through a sequence of programmed louvers and roof vents. At night, the building's transparent façade glows like a lantern in the landscape when used as a theatre.

According to the project and design architect, Michael Heenan, the real excitement of the building is how it reflects the colours of the morning and evening light, as well the surrounding bushland. "This is really about light, the skin of the building is perfectly smooth, and therefore reflects whatever is around it."

Material 
Danpalon™, a high tech polycarbon, was used for the walls and roofing panels which allows up to 90% daylight infiltration. Usage of energy is low and no mechanical ventilation is required.

Originally, clear Danpalon™ Muticell was proposed, but a custom material design that varied in terms of its light and solar transfer properties was suggested by SolarSpace™ instead. The Danpalon Heatstop, reflective grey in colour, was finally chosen for its overall efficiencies but additionally, the solar transmission grade was to vary and suit the building's orientation. The resulting solution was to use 1% solar transmitting material on the roof, 3.5% solar transmission on the eastern and western walls, and the basic 18% solar transmission on the northern and southern elevations. Less heat is transferred into the building and artificial lighting is not required at all during the day.

The floor system uses concrete slabs with sprung timber floor for basketball, netball, volleyball, and wall-climbing.

Total 2030m2

Awards 
2007 Royal Australian Institute of Architects (RAIA) Blacket Prize for Regional Architecture
2007 Royal Australian Institute of Architects (RAIA) Commendation for Public Architecture
2007 Royal Australian Institute of Architects (RAIA) Commendation for Sustainable Architecture

References

External links 
 Allen Jack+Cottier Official Website
 Winner of RAIA Award 2007
 Danpalon™ Official Website
 Full List of RAIA Award 2007

Entertainment venues in New South Wales
Buildings and structures completed in 2005